Silk is an American brand of dairy-substitute products (including soy milk, soy yogurt, almond milk, almond yogurt, cashew milk, coconut milk, oat milk, and other dairy-alternative products) currently owned by Danone after it purchased WhiteWave Foods in 2016.

History 
Whitewave Foods was founded in Boulder, Colorado, in 1977 by Steve Demos, initially focusing on soy and tofu products. The first product was introduced in March 1996 by WhiteWave, Inc. at the Natural Foods Expo in Anaheim, California. In the years that followed, Silk became a successful, worldwide, organic food brand.

In 2002 WhiteWave, Inc was sold to Dean Foods for over $300 million. The company's sales grew to $350 million in annual revenues by 2005. As the business grew, Silk became the largest purchaser of organic, Non GMO soybeans in North America.  According to Silk's web site in August 2009, all its soy beans are sourced from North America including organic and non-GMO soybeans.

In January 2010, the company introduced Silk Pure Almond, an almond milk, and its first non-soy-based product.

In 2013, WhiteWave Foods separated from Dean Foods, and became an independent, publicly traded company.

Silk has been a five-year recipient of the Green Power Leadership Award from the U.S. Department of Energy and the Environmental Protection Agency.  Silk has been a supporter of Farm Aid since 2002. Silk is a member of the Soyfoods Association of North America (SANA), which provides information about the health benefits and nutritional advantages of soy consumption.

In July 2016 it was announced that the French company Danone would purchase WhiteWave Foods for $10.4 billion. The acquisition was completed in April 2017 and newly formed company was named "DanoneWave"

Lawsuit 
In the fall of 2009 the Pioneer Press reported that the Cornucopia Institute had made complaints to the U.S. Department of Agriculture accusing Silk producer Dean Foods and its WhiteWave Foods division, of shifting their products away from organics without properly notifying retailers or consumers. According to the Star Telegram and other news sources, Silk brand soy milk was made using organic soybeans switched to conventional soybeans while maintaining the same UPC barcodes and prices on the Silk products while replacing the word "organic" with "natural" on the Silk product packaging.

Silk maintains that it sources only domestic/U.S. soy beans. The brand has also enrolled all of its products in the Non-GMO Project's verification process.

Products 
:

 Refrigerated soy milk: Vanilla, Original, Chocolate, Very Vanilla, DHA Omega-3, Organic Vanilla, Unsweet Vanilla, Organic Unsweetened, Plain Plus Omega-3 DHA (discontinued 2013)
 Light soy milk: Original, Vanilla, Chocolate
 Shelf-stable soy milk: Original Aseptic, Vanilla Aseptic, Organic Unsweetened Aseptic, Starbucks Vanilla Aseptic (A special blend made for use and purchase in Starbucks' stores)
 Shelf-stable single-serve soy milk: Very Vanilla, Chocolate
 Specialty soy milk: Pumpkin Spice (seasonal), Nog (seasonal), Chocolate Mint (seasonal)
 Dairy-free yogurt alternative: Peach Almond, Strawberry Almond, Vanilla Almond, Dark Chocolate Coconut Almond, Plain Almond, Peach & Mango Soy, Blueberry Soy, Strawberry Soy, Vanilla Soy, Tropical Pineapple Soy, Plain Soy
 Creamer: Vanilla Soy, Original Soy, Hazelnut Soy, Vanilla Almond, Caramel Almond, Hazelnut Almond
 Almond milk: Vanilla, Original, Organic Original, Dark Chocolate, Unsweetened Vanilla, Unsweetened, Light Vanilla, Light Original
 Cashew milk: Original, Unsweetened, Unsweetened Vanilla, Chocolate
 Coconut milk: Vanilla, Original, Unsweetened
 Almond+Coconut Blend: Original Blend, Unsweetened Blend
 Protein nut milk: 2g Sugar, Vanilla, Chocolate
Oat Yeah! OatMilk: The Plain One, Vanilla, Zero Sugar, Oatmeal Cookie Creamer

See also

 Almond milk
 Lactose intolerance
 List of dishes made using coconut milk
 Milk substitute
 Non-dairy creamer – some items discussed in article that may include dairy excipients
 Plant cream
 Soy yogurt

References

External links

 

Soy product brands
Plant milk
Non-dairy yogurts
Products introduced in 1977
1977 establishments in Colorado
Companies based in Boulder, Colorado
Drink companies of the United States
Groupe Danone brands